Lowell is a town in West Creek and Cedar Creek townships, Lake County, Indiana, United States. The population was 9,276 at the 2010 census.

History
Lowell was platted in 1853. It was named after Lowell, Massachusetts.

The James Brannon House, Melvin A. Halsted House, Lowell Commercial Historic District, Charles E. Nichols House, and J. Claude Rumsey House are listed in the National Register of Historic Places.

Geography
Lowell is located at  (41.2924, −87.4151).

Located five miles (8 km) outside of the Great Lakes Basin, Lowell sought permission to pipe in lake water to replace city water drawn from its high fluoride deep wells. However, diversion of water out of the Great Lakes requires the approval of the Great Lakes Commission, which includes representatives of all the US states and Canadian provinces that border on the lakes. Lowell's request was turned down in 1991.

Lowell lies on the Valparaiso Moraine, almost on the Kankakee Outwash Plain. The town also lies near the St. Lawrence Seaway Divide.

Climate
Lowell has a Humid continental climate (Köppen climate classification Dfa) with four distinct seasons.

Demographics

2010 census
As of the census of 2010, there were 9,276 people, 3,392 households, and 2,500 families living in the town. The racial makeup of the town was 95.9% White, 0.5% African American, 0.4% Native American, 0.3% Asian, 0.1% Pacific Islander, 1.7% from other races, and 1.2% from two or more races. Hispanic or Latino of any race were 6.9% of the population.

There were 3,392 households, of which 39.1% had children under the age of 18 living with them, 56.3% were married couples living together, 11.9% had a female householder with no husband present, 5.5% had a male householder with no wife present, and 26.3% were non-families. 21.4% of all households were made up of individuals, and 8.3% had someone living alone who was 65 years of age or older. The average household size was 2.71 and the average family size was 3.16.

The median age in the town was 35.7 years. 26.6% of residents were under the age of 18; 8.8% were between the ages of 18 and 24; 27.8% were from 25 to 44; 25.1% were from 45 to 64; and 11.7% were 65 years of age or older. The gender makeup of the town was 49.2% male and 50.8% female.

2000 census
As of the census of 2000, there were 7,505 people, 2,697 households, and 2,030 families living in the town. The racial makeup of the town was 97.30% White, 0.03% African American, 0.39% Native American, 0.24% Asian, 0.01% Pacific Islander, 1.12% from other races, and 0.92% from two or more races. Hispanic or Latino of any race was 3.53% of the population.

There were 2,697 households, out of which 39.3% had children under the age of 18 living with them, 62.2% were married couples living together, 10.3% had a female householder with no husband present, and 24.7% were non families. 20.4% of all households were made up of individuals, and 7.6% had someone living alone who was 65 years of age or older. The average household size was 2.74, and the average family size was 3.19.

In the town, the population was spread out, with 28.6% under the age of 18, 8.3% from 18 to 24, 31.1% from 25 to 44, 21.1% from 45 to 64, and 10.8% who were 65 years of age or older. The median age was 34 years. For every 100 females, there were 96.5 males. For every 100 females age 18 and over, there were 91.3 males.

The median income for a household in the town was $49,173, and the median income for a family was $54,797. Males had a median income of $45,023, versus $23,378 for females. The per capita income for the town was $19,752. About 5.6% of families and 6.5% of the population were below the poverty line, including 7.8% of those under age 18 and 5.4% of those age 65 or over.

Schools
Lowell Senior High School
Lowell Middle School
Lake Prairie Elementary School
Oak Hill Elementary School
Three Creeks Elementary School
Lowell Christian Academy
St.Edwards Catholic School (Pre-School Only)

Events
Lowell Labor Day Parade & Labor Day Fest. Lowell hosts the oldest Labor Day parade in Indiana. Buckley Homestead, east of Lowell, hosts a number of events, including a World War II reenactment with authentic weapons, artillery, and tanks. The Legend of Sleepy Hollow is another event that takes place in Lowell in September. During the event, the townsfolk search for Ichabod Crain, the only man who can tell the true story of the Headless Horseman.

Notable people
Mary Emma Allison, humanitarian and librarian
Steve Carter, 41st Indiana Attorney General
Corbett Davis, quarterback and top NFL draft pick in 1938 to the Cleveland Rams
Amy Ruley, member of Women's Basketball Hall of Fame
Jo Anne Worley, actress and comedian

References

External links
Town website
Detailed history of Lowell on the Lowell Public Library's website
 South Shore CVA

Towns in Lake County, Indiana
Towns in Indiana
populated places established in 1834
1852 establishments in Indiana